Liquid Paper is an American brand of the Newell Brands company marketed internationally that sells correction fluid, correction pens, and correction tape. Mainly used to correct typewriting in the past, correction products now mostly cover handwriting mistakes.

Product history

In 1956, Bette Nesmith Graham (mother of future The Monkees guitarist Michael Nesmith) invented the first correction fluid in her kitchen. Working as a typist, she used to make many mistakes and always strove for a way to correct them. Starting on a basis of tempera paint she mixed with a common kitchen blender, she called the fluid "Mistake Out" and started to provide her co-workers with small bottles on which the brand's name was displayed.

By 1958, Graham founded the Mistake Out Company and continued working from her kitchen (and eventually garage) nights and weekends to produce small batches of correction bottles. She was fired from her typist job as executive secretary at Texas Bank and Trust after she accidentally put her own company’s name on a sheet of her employer’s company letterhead. She subsequently decided to devote all her time to Mistake Out.

Graham offered her correction fluid to IBM, which declined the offer (the company announced its own Correcting Selectric with an integrated lift-off tape in 1973). By 1968, the product – now renamed Liquid Paper – was profitable, and in 1979 the company was sold to the Gillette Corporation for $47.5 million with royalties.

Acquisition
In 2000, the Liquid Paper product and brand name was acquired by Newell Rubbermaid (now Newell Brands). In some regions of the world, Liquid Paper is now endorsed by Papermate, a widely known writing instruments brand (also owned by Newell).

Ingredients

 MSDSs list Liquid Eraser as containing titanium dioxide, solvent naphtha, mineral spirits, resins, dispersant, and fragrances.

Liquid Paper came under scrutiny in the 1980s, due to concerns over recreational sniffing. The organic solvent 1,1,1-trichloroethane (TCA) was used as a thinner in the product. Liquid Paper containing TCA was thought to be toxic and carcinogenic, but later studies showed that although the thinner was toxic there was no evidence of carcinogenicity. There were several studies linking fatalities to the TCA  contained in correction fluids, including Liquid Paper.

In 1989, Gillette reformulated Liquid Paper without TCA, in response to a complaint under California Proposition 65.

See also
 Correction fluid
 Correction tape
 Pentel
 Wite-Out
 Tipp-Ex

References

External links
 
 Papermate US website
 Official Web site
 Liquid Paper on inventors.about.com

Correction instruments
Newell Brands
1979 mergers and acquisitions
2000 mergers and acquisitions